Moorabool is a bounded rural locality of the City of Greater Geelong local government area in Victoria, Australia.

History
Moorabool Post Office opened on 1 October 1861 and closed in 1960.

In 2021, the Victorian Big Battery began operations at Moorabool.

Heritage listed sites
Moorabool contains a number of heritage listed sites, including:

 Geelong-Ballarat railway line, Cowies Creek Rail Bridge No. 2
 275 Ballan Road, Moorabool railway station
 Geelong-Ballarat railway line, Moorabool River Railway Viaduct

References

External links

Towns in Victoria (Australia)
1861 establishments in Australia
Suburbs of Geelong